The Argentine Mauser Model 1909 were Gewehr 98 pattern bolt-action battle rifles designed for the Argentine Army. They were produced both in Germany and in Argentina.

Design 

The Mauser 1909 was a slightly modified copy of the Gewehr 98. Among other modifications, the Lange Visier sight was replaced by a tangent leaf sight. The M1909 was also able to use the bayonet of the Mauser 1891 it replaced. The main producer in Germany was Deutsche Waffen und Munitionsfabriken that delivered 200,000 rifles while around 85,000 rifles were manufactured by the Fabrica Militar de Armas Portatiles, governmental plants in Rosario and Santa Fe. The Model 1909s were replaced by FN FALs without having seen combat.

Some Argentine Mauser 1909 rifles and carbines without crests were sold to Paraguay during the Chaco War.

Variants 
 Mauser 1909 sniper rifle: version with a German-made scope and a bent-down bolt handle.
 Mauser 1909 cavalry carbine: shortened variant, with a straight grip stock and a forecap that covers all the barrel. The bayonet can be attached under this forecap.
 Mauser 1909 Mountain Carbine or Engineers Carbine:

Peruvian Mauser 1909 

Peru received between 1910 and 1914 thousands of Mauser Model 1909 rifles, chambered in 7.65 Mauser. They were closer copies of the Gewehr 98, including the Lange Visier sight. Aside from the caliber, the only differences were the larger receiver ring, the  shorter breech, the slightly modified strip guide to use older Model 1891 strips, the longer hammer, the aspheric shape of the bolt handle and the Peruvian markings. While these rifles were able to fire the old bullets with round nose, they were later adapted to spitzer bullets. These weapons were used during the Leticia Incident and the Ecuadorian–Peruvian War. After 1945, the Mauser 1909s were replaced by American weapons and were sold in the civilian market in the 1960s, a few being kept as ceremonial rifles.

References

 
 
 

Rifles of Argentina
7.65×53mm Mauser rifles
Mauser rifles
Sniper rifles
Weapons of Peru